USS Epsilon was a tugboat acquired by the Union Navy during the American Civil War. She was used by the Union Navy as a tugboat and dispatch boat  to support Union Navy patrol vessels on Confederate waterways.

Service history 

Epsilon, a steam tug, was purchased as Harry Bumm at Philadelphia, 3 June 1864, and assigned to duty in the James River. She was known as Tug No. 5 until November 1864 when she was named Epsilon. Throughout her career, Epsilon performed useful service in the James, reconnoitering, patrolling, serving as picket, carrying mail, and transferring men from one ship's company to another. Epsilon was ordered north in May 1865 and was sold at New York City 12 July 1865.

References 

Ships of the Union Navy
Tugs of the United States Navy
Dispatch boats of the United States Navy
Steamships of the United States Navy
American Civil War auxiliary ships of the United States